Nesrin Baş is a Turkish freestyle wrestler competing in the 68 kg division. She is a member of Beşiktaş J.K. She won the gold medal in the women's 68kg event at the 2022 U23 World Wrestling Championships held in Pontevedra, Spain.

Career 
In 2021, Nesrin Baş won a bronze medal in the women's 68 kg event at the 2021 World Junior Wrestling Championships in Russia.

She competed in the 68 kg event at the 2022 World Wrestling Championships held in Belgrade, Serbia. She won the gold medal in her event at the 2023 European U23 Wrestling Championships held in Bucharest, Romania.

References

External links 
 

Living people
Turkish female sport wrestlers
2002 births
21st-century Turkish women